Peruvannamuzhi or Peruvannamoozhy is a village in Chakkittapara Panchayath Kozhikode district, Kerala, India. Peruvannamuzhi forms part of the newly inaugurated Malabar Wildlife Sanctuary and is rich in flora and fauna.

Tourism
The main attraction of Peruvannamuzhi is its natural splendor, a calm and quiet land nestled in the Western Ghats. Kuttiyadi Irrigation Project Dam is situated in Peruvannamuzhi. Peruvannamuzhi is known for tourism, wildlife and research on spice crops.

There is a reservoir with facilities for boating, and nature reserves. The reservoir supplies irrigation water to Kozhikode, Malapuram and Kannur. Other attractions include a crocodile farm and gardens. Peruvannamuzhi is rich in bird life and over 90 species of birds have been recorded at the Experimental Farm of Indian Institute of Spices Research.

Peruvannamuzhi Dam
(within 5 km from Chempanoda)
Peruvannamoozhy, a scenic village located 60 km Kozhikode city, Kerala has been included in the list of eco-tourism destinations in Kerala with the Tourism Minister inaugurating the eco-tourism project here on 10 August 2008.

An ecological hotspot in the Western Ghats, the eco tourism destination of Peruvannamoozhy is home to over 680 species of rare plants. The facilities available here include wild animal rehabilitation centre, bird sanctuary, crocodile farm, snake park, spice garden, trekking and boating. The reservoir here provides facilities for speedboat and rowboat cruises. There is a garden called Smaraka Thottam, which is built in the memory of the freedom fighters of the region. Uninhabited islands add to the charm of the place.

Activities
The area is an ideal location for nature enthusiasts. The irrigation dam and the garden nearby are added attractions. As part of ecotourism initiatives, the following facilities have been created:

What to do/Visit in Peruvannamoozhy
 Animal rehabilitation centre
 Bathing facility in river
 Bird sanctuary
 Snake park
 Trekking programmes
 Bamboo rafting 
 speedboat and rowboat cruises

Access
How to reach Peruvannamuzhi Dam
1) By road: the Peruvannamuzhi Dam can be reached by road within two hours from Kozhikode city
2) By rail: the nearby railway station is Vatakara Railway Station
3) By air: the nearby airport is Karipur International Airport

Minor attractions
 Crocodile farm (within 5 km from Chempanoda)
 Janakikadu (within 5 km from Chempanoda)
Janakikadu is a thick forest which attracts thousands of tourists every year. There is a wide variety of birds in this forest. An ecological hot spot in the Western Ghats, the ecotourism destination of Janakikadu is home to over 680 species of rare plants.

 Pottiyapara (within 5 km from Chempanoda)
This region offers immense scope for picnicking and Trekking programmes. The area is an ideal location for nature enthusiasts. The 360° scenic view of the valley from the top of Pottiyapara is breathtaking.

History
The history of Peruvannamuzhi closely related to the history of Perambra, a town in Koyilandy taluk of Kozhikode district in North Malabar region of Kerala state, India. Perambra Village was part of 'Payyormala Nadu' in the past. Payyormala was subject to the Paleri, Avinhatt and Koothali Nayars of Payyörmala. They were independent chieftains, with some theoretical dependence on the Kurumbrunad family and also on the Zamorin. 
In 1941, O.C Jose from Ullattikulam, Chalakudi bought the Peruvannamuzhi area from Avinhatt Thambai's sister Parukutti Amma.

In 1941, five people from Travancore, Paikayil Thomman from Paika (Pala) Kottayam, Kallur Joseph from Erumeli, Madathinakathu Chacko, Vattothu Kutty, Kulathinkal Varkey bought the Peruvannamuzhi area from O.C Jose for 10 (ten) rupees per acre. The history of Peruvannamuzhi and nearby villages started here.
Peruvanamuzhi Fathima Matha Catholic church is established in 1953 under the guidance of Fr. C J Varkey. This was followed by the construction of Fathima Matha Primary School, the first school in the area.

Major organizations
Indian Institute of Spices Research has a farm here.  There is a Farm Science Center of the provincial government. Central Reserve Police Force maintains a battalion here.  There is a district agricultural farm at Koovapoyil.  There are many forest and irrigation offices in Peruvannamuzhi. The government also maintains a tourist bungalow here which is cheaper than private hotels.

There is a government drinking water project called JBIC.  Kuttiady Irrigation project runs the dam administration.

There is one St. Fathima matha Church and a Shrine of Our Lady of Health here.  The biggest Hindu temple is called Omcareswaram Kshethram which is located at Pillaperuvanna.

Transportation
Peruvannamuzhi village connects to other parts of India through Vatakara town on the west and Kuttiady town on the east.  National highway No.66 passes through Vatakara and the northern stretch connects to Mangalore, Goa and Mumbai.  The southern stretch connects to Cochin and Trivandrum.  The eastern National Highway No.54 going through Kuttiady connects to Mananthavady, Mysore and Bangalore. The nearest airports are at Kannur and Kozhikode.  The nearest railway station is at Vatakara.

External links

 Peruvannamuzhi
 Peruvannamuzhi

Kuttiady area